Ankit Rajpara (born 27 August 1994) is India's 36th chess Grandmaster and a chess prodigy from Gujarat. He started playing chess at the age of 8 and achieved great successes at National Junior chess tournaments.

References

External links
 

1994 births
Living people
Indian chess players
Chess grandmasters